was a Japanese writer.

Born in Hyogo Prefecture, Iwano wanted to become a Christian missionary, but he finally ended up as a literature expert. After some unsuccessful poetry books and kabuki dramas, he published poetical dramas (Shintaishi no sahō, 1907; Shintaishi shi, 1907–08) and analyses of literature (Shimpiteki hanjū shugi, 1906; Shin shizen shugi, 1908). From 1909 on, he wrote some autobiographical novels like Tandeki (1909) and Hōmei gobusaku (1911).

He translated Plutarch.

References

Louis Frédéric : Japan Encyclopedia. Harvard University Press, 2002 (Japon, dictionnaire et civilisation), p. 409

External links
 www.aozora.gr.jp,  Aozora Bunko

1873 births
1920 deaths
Japanese writers
Japanese translators